Sea of Light may refer to:

 Darya-ye Noor, a famous large Persian diamond
 Sea of Light (album), a 1995 musical album by Uriah Heep